The Stolen Airliner  is a 1955 British Children's Film Foundation production, directed by Don Sharp and starring Fella Edmonds, Diana Day, and Michael Maguire. It was based on John Pudney's adventure story for boys, Thursday Adventure (1955).

It was Don Sharp's debut film as director following his decision to abandon acting. According to Anthony Hayward the film  "demonstrated his ability to keep the action fast-paced".

Premise
An international gang of revolutionaries hijack a plane which is being guarded by three young air cadets. The crooks are overpowered in midair, and the Royal Air Force eventually comes to the rescue.

Cast
 Fella Edmonds - Fred
 Diana Day - Anne
 Michael Maguire - John
 Peter Dyneley - Uncle George
 Nicola Braithwaite - Kitty
 Ballard Berkeley - Mr. Head
 Iris Russell - Mrs. Head
 David King-Wood - Controller

Production
It was Don Sharp's first feature as director, although he had directed some documentaries. Sharp had written a number of films with John Pudney, whose novel formed the basis for this film. Sharp called it "a very good little action movie".

References

External links

1955 films
British aviation films
Films directed by Don Sharp
Films based on British novels
1950s English-language films
1950s British films
British black-and-white films